Christos Pentsas (born 31 May 1988) is a former Greek footballer who last played for Thesprotos.

External links
 Guardian Football
Profile at EPAE.org
Profile at Onsports.gr

1988 births
Living people
Greek footballers
Olympiacos F.C. players
Panthrakikos F.C. players
Association football forwards
Footballers from Thessaloniki